Alberto da Costa Pereira (22 December 1929 – 25 October 1990) was a Portuguese footballer who played as a goalkeeper.

Club career
Born in Nacala, Portuguese Mozambique from a colonial White African family, Costa Pereira was noticed by S.L. Benfica while playing with Clube Ferroviário de Lourenço Marques. He signed with the Portuguese in 1954 and immediately became first-choice, playing 26 games in his first season and winning the first of his eight national championships.

Internationally, Costa Pereira won two consecutive European Cup with Benfica in 1961 and 1962, and lost two finals in 1963 and 1965. In the latter, against Inter Milan at the San Siro, a Jair late attempt into the first half slid under his body and entered the net, for the game's only goal – he was also injured shortly after, and had to be replaced by field player Germano since replacements were not allowed, and Benfica played more than 30 minutes with ten players.

Costa Pereira retired in June 1967 at nearly 38 years of age, having appeared in 358 official matches for Benfica. He died in Lisbon on 25 October 1990, aged 60.

International career
Costa Pereira played 22 times for Portugal. His debut came on 22 May 1955, against England in Porto (3–1 win).

Costa Pereira started the successful qualifying campaign to the 1966 FIFA World Cup, featuring in a 5–1 routing of Turkey in Lisbon on 24 January 1965. He was, however, overlooked for the finals by manager Otto Glória – his former boss at Benfica – due to poor form, as the national team went on to finish in third place.

Honours
Benfica
Primeira Liga: 1954–55, 1956–57, 1959–60, 1960–61, 1962–63, 1963–64, 1964–65, 1966–67
Taça de Portugal (5): 1954–55, 1956–57, 1958–59, 1961–62, 1963–64
Taça de Honra (1)
European Cup: 1960–61, 1961–62
Intercontinental Cup runner-up: 1961, 1962

Individual
World Soccer World XI: 1965

References

External links
 
 
 

1929 births
1990 deaths
People from Nampula Province
Colonial people in Mozambique
Portuguese footballers
Portuguese people of Mozambican descent
Clube Ferroviário de Maputo footballers
Association football goalkeepers
Primeira Liga players
S.L. Benfica footballers
Portugal international footballers
Portuguese football managers
UEFA Champions League winning players